Galenbecker See is a lake in the Mecklenburgische Seenplatte district in Mecklenburg-Vorpommern, Germany. At an elevation of 9.6 m, its surface area is 5.9 km².

References

External links 

 

Lakes of Mecklenburg-Western Pomerania
Ramsar sites in Germany
Nature reserves in Mecklenburg-Western Pomerania